Love Again is an upcoming American romantic comedy-drama film written and directed by James C. Strouse. It is an English-language remake of the 2016 German film SMS für Dich, itself based on a novel by Sofie Cramer. It stars Priyanka Chopra, Sam Heughan, and Celine Dion portraying a fictionalized version of herself in her first film role.

It is scheduled to be released by Sony Pictures Releasing on May 12, 2023.

Premise 
Mira Ray, dealing with the loss of her fiancé, sends a series of romantic texts to his old cell phone number…not realizing the number was reassigned to Rob Burns’ new work phone. A journalist, Rob is captivated by the honesty in the beautifully confessional texts. When he’s assigned to write a profile of megastar Celine Dion, he enlists her help in figuring out how to meet Mira in person…and win her heart.

Cast 
 Priyanka Chopra Jonas as Mira Ray
 Sam Heughan as Rob Burns
 Celine Dion as herself
 Russell Tovey
 Steve Oram
 Omid Djalili
 Sofia Barclay
 Lydia West
 Arinzé Kene
 Celia Imrie
 Nick Jonas

Production
In April 2019, it was announced James C. Strouse would direct the film, tentatively titled Text for You, which would be an English-language remake of the German film SMS für Dich, with Screen Gems set to produce. In October 2020, Priyanka Chopra, Sam Heughan and Celine Dion joined the cast of the film. In November 2020, Russell Tovey, Steve Oram, Omid Djalili, Sofia Barclay, Lydia West, Arinzé Kene and Celia Imrie joined the cast.

Principal photography began in October 2020 and ended in early 2021. Filming first took place in London, after which production moved to the United States.

In April 2022, it was announced that the film had been retitled It's All Coming Back to Me, after the song "It's All Coming Back to Me Now", which Dion covered on her 1996 album Falling into You. In November 2022, it was announced that the film was retitled to Love Again.

Music 
In an episode of the Just for Variety podcast, Sam Heughan said that Dion had recorded a new song for the film.

Release 
The film is set to release in the United States theatrically on May 12, 2023, by Sony Pictures Releasing. It was originally scheduled to be released on February 10, 2023.

References

External links 
 
 
 
  

2020s American films
2020s English-language films
2023 romantic drama films
American remakes of German films
American romantic drama films
Celine Dion
Films about interracial romance
Films based on adaptations
Films based on German novels
Films based on romance novels
Films directed by James C. Strouse
Films produced by Basil Iwanyk
Films scored by Keegan DeWitt
Films shot in London
Romance film remakes
Screen Gems films
Thunder Road Films films
Upcoming English-language films